Myles Frost (born July 21, 1999) is an American actor, dancer, and singer. He won the 2022 Tony Award for Best Actor in a Musical for his portrayal of Michael Jackson in the Broadway theatre production of MJ the Musical and received a Grammy Award nomination for the cast recording.

Life and career
Frost was born in Silver Spring, Maryland. He spent his early years moving back and forth between Maryland and Washington, D.C. Raised by his mother, Charmayne Strayhorn, a systems engineer, and his grandmother, a school teacher, he developed two enduring passions early in life: golf, beginning at the age of three, and piano, beginning at the age of five. Growing up he sang and played the piano and drums at church, and he performed in an R&B cover band in middle school at local shopping centers. While attending Thomas S. Wootton High School in  Rockville, Maryland, he performed in school productions of the musicals Hairspray (as Seaweed), Legally Blonde (as Warner), and Cinderella (as Lord Pinkleton). In 2017, while still in high school, he was a contestant on The Voice but didn't get a chair turn.

After graduating from high school, Frost entered Belmont University in Nashville where he studied music technology for two years. He transferred from Belmont to Bowie State University as an audio engineering major, but ultimately left school when he was cast as Michael Jackson in the Broadway production of MJ the Musical. Frost earned the role after Ephraim Sykes left the production late in the show's development, and the producers had to locate a new actor rapidly. The production team auditioned many established actors, but none of them was working, and broadened their search. A YouTube video of Frost performing the song "Billie Jean" from a high school talent show drew the attention of the producers, and he was invited to audition; ultimately winning the part. Earning positive critical attention, Frost won the 2022 Tony Award for Best Actor in a Musical for his portrayal of Michael Jackson in the Broadway theatre production of MJ the Musical. Myles is set to leave the production on April 2, 2023. He will be replaced by Elijah Johnson.

Awards and nominations

References

1999 births
Living people
American male musical theatre actors
Belmont University alumni
Bowie State University alumni
Tony Award winners